The mining industry of the Democratic Republic of the Congo produces copper, diamonds, tantalum, tin, gold, and more than 63% of global cobalt production. Minerals and petroleum are central to the DRC's economy, making up more than 95% of value of its exports.

The Democratic Republic of the Congo (DRC) is one of the wealthiest countries in terms of untapped resource wealth and has an estimated US$24 trillion in untapped mineral deposits, including the world's largest reserves of coltan (where elements niobium and tantalum are extracted) and significant quantities of the world's cobalt and lithium.

Regulation and organization
Mining law in the DRC is given by the mining code, which was passed into law by the Joseph Kabila administration in 2018. This replaced the previous code passed by Kabila in 2002 near the end of the Second Congo War. The revised code was opposed by many multinational mining companies, since it introduced new taxes and removed stability clause protecting existing investments from changes to regulations.

Industrial mines

Most large industrial mines are run by joint ventures between a foreign company and one of the DRC's state-owned (parastatal) mining companies. Large scale exploration permits (PR) and exploitation permits (PE) are officially granted by the DRC Mining Register (CAMI). Such ventures typically require years of planning, and involve millions of dollars of investment. The largest financiers are the Congolese firm Rawbank, which as of 2022 had leant out $820 million to mining companies, and the Kenyan firm Equity Group Holdings.

Semi-industrial and artisanal mines

  
Much mining has been done in small artisanal mining operations, sometimes known as Artisanal and Small-Scale Mining (ASM). These small-scale mines were unregulated, with high levels of child labor and workplace injury. Officially, artisanal mining is authorized in specially designated Artisanal Exploitation Zones (AEZ). However, in practice, these zones are comparatively small, and most artisanal mining takes place elsewhere, where it is common for artisanal miners to trespass onto industrial sites to work. Artisanal miners at a particular site are often organized into a cooperative.

Most artisanal mining is carried out with simple hand tools. Semi-industrial mining refers to operations which make use of some degree of mechanization, but with less investment than industrial operations run by large companies.

Supply chain regulation

Today, larger mining companies and non-for-profit organisations are addressing these complex issues and are continuously adopting international guidance and initiatives that helps set up regulations on a community to community basis with government support and involvement. A number of initiatives are the ESG ( Environmental, Social and Governance) and IRMA (Initiative for Responsible Mining Assurance). One such globally recognised certification is the 3T iTSCi, the only widely implemented and accepted mineral traceability and due diligence system in the region for the 3T minerals – Tin, Tantalum and Tungsten, an internationally recognised certification for responsible mining and traceability under the 2010 Dodd-Frank Act. Today four central African countries including the Democratic Republic of Congo (DRC) provides legitimate and ethical 3T minerals. ITSCI is the only industry initiative with standards 100% aligned with the OECD Guidance  Much has been done in the last 15 years, providing artisanal and small-scale miners a support network through iTSCi, to build the foundations and regulate the industry, it also offers safety to the community participants and miners, education and training, safe practices, human rights, protection to the environment for sustainable practices and manage the social aspect.

At the end of 2019 ITSCI has seen to 2000 mines, employment of around 80,000 miners, and the supply of over 2000 tonnes of tin, tantalum and tungsten minerals per month. A report had been done by Pact in 2015, detailing iTSCi’s progress over the previous five years, it discusses the successes, the challenges ahead and the work yet to be done. Mining can occur within protected areas, and around endangered or threatened species.  many ASM operations existed for minerals such as coltan. ASM operations employ a significant portion of the DRC's population; estimates range up to one fifth of the population, or 12.5 million people. Problems stemming from artisanal mining include disruption of families, mining-related illnesses, environmental damage, child labor, prostitution and rape.

There is a push globally by the EU and major car manufacturers for global production of cobalt, tin, tantalum, tungsten and lithium to be sourced and produced sustainably, the materials needed for the new technologies that are being deployed as the globe transforms into new energy systems. Companies are adopting and practising ESG initiatives in line with OECD Guidance and putting in place evidence of zero to low carbon footprint activities in the supply chain production of lithium-ion batteries. A 2010 US law required American companies to disclose the source for conflict minerals: tin, tantalum, tungsten and gold. Amnesty International are now advocating for cobalt to be added to this list, to ensure transparency amongst tech giants and traceability of the supply chain. These initiatives are already taking place with major mining companies, Artisanal and Small-Scale Mining companies (ASM). Car manufacturers and battery manufacturer supply chains Tesla, VW, BMW, BASF, Glencore are participating in several initiatives, such as the Responsible Cobalt Initiative and Cobalt for Development study. In 2018 BMW Group in partnership with BASF, Samsung SDI and Samsung Electronics have launched a pilot project in the DRC over one pilot mine, to improve conditions and address challenges for artisanal miners and the surrounding communities. BMW’s involvement in these projects suggests they may need to source additional supply of cobalt from DRC mines in future, having a long-term strategic approach to sustainability in this region.

In the US, the 2010 Dodd–Frank Wall Street Reform and Consumer Protection Act has required retailers and manufacturers to track and publish the amount of conflict minerals sourced from the DRC. In August 2012, the U.S. Securities and Exchange Commission (SEC) issued the final regulations. However, the regulation requiring manufacturers to publicly disclose the use of conflict materials was challenged by the National Association of Manufacturers as a First Amendment violation, and overturned in 2014. The DC Circuit Court of Appeals upheld the decision in 2015.

By product

Copper and cobalt

In the DRC, copper and cobalt resources are mined in the south of the country in the Copperbelt, in the Lualaba and Haut-Katanga Provinces. Most cobalt in the DRC is found in these copper mines. The south of the DRC is more politically stable than the eastern DRC, so copper and cobalt mining generally has comparatively fewer conflict resource concerns compared to the 3TG minerals mined in the eastern DRC.

The majority of copper-cobalt mining is carried out on an industrial scale by various joint ventures between a foreign company and the Congolese state owned Gécamines as a minority partner. Glencore’s decision to mothball its Mutanda mine in August 2019 in the Congo citing cobalt and copper operation is uneconomic due to falling commodities prices and an increase in a government royalty tax during the years of Kabila influence. Mutanda — the world’s largest cobalt mine — was pegged to transition to care and maintenance (temporary closure) by year-end 2019, the world’s largest and responsible for 20% global output.

Artisanal mining of copper and cobalt, usually by hand, is also widespread. In December 2019, the DRC government announced the Enterprise Generale du Cobalt (EGC), the state-owned miner Gecamines would become the state-controlled buyer of cobalt, to purchase and market all cobalt from small-scale artisanal miners (accounting for 15 to 30% of cobalt production), that is not mined industrially. This in effect will centralise the trade, help better regulate the industry in the DRC by fighting mining fraud and maximise state revenues. However, as of May 2022, the company had not yet begun purchasing any cobalt, and the Congolese minister of mines was considering canceling the company's cobalt buying monopoly. In the United States, Tesla, alongside Google, Apple and others, were sued by a human rights group in December 2019 for artisanal cobalt mined under unsafe and unethical conditions, including the use of child labour in the sourcing of cobalt in their supply chains. The lawsuit was later dismissed.

Diamonds

Diamond mining in the DRC is done mostly by artisanal miners, and almost exclusively by hand. Artisanal diamond mining employs an estimated 1 million people in the DRC. Despite being one of the world's largest diamond produces by volume, fewer diamonds form DRC are of gemstone quality compared to other countries, and more diamonds are of the less expensive industrial-grade variety.

Diamond mining centers include Tshikapa, capital of Kasaï Province. In 2022, a mining collapse in the Tshikpa area killed several dozen artisanal miners. An industrial diamond miner in the DRC, the state company Societé Minière de Bakwanga (MIBA), also has long operated diamond mines near Mbuji-Mayi in Kasaï-Oriental province. In 1990, one of the largest colorless diamonds in the world, the Millennium Star, was found in the Mbuji-Mayi area. In 2013, the assets and debt of the state controlled Societe Congolaise d’Investissement Minier Sprl (SCIM) were given to a new 50/50 joint venture between the Congolese government and the Anhui Foreign Economic Construction Group, Societe Anhui-Congo d'Investissement Minier Sprl (SACIM). According to the deal, Anhui promised to spend $100 million on various infrastructure projects. By 2017, SACIM produced 85% of the industrially mined diamonds in the DRC. MIBA's and SACIM's mining permits are directly adjacent to each other.

Gold
The Twangiza-Namoya gold belt in the eastern DRC contains large gold deposits, as well as the Kilo-Moto greenstone belt in northeast corner of the DRC. Mines include the large industrial Kibali Gold Mine, as well as many small artisanal mines.

Gold from the DRC is often a conflict mineral, and is often used to fund rebel groups in the DRC by smuggling gold over the border into nearby countries such as Uganda. In August 2021, South Kivu governor Theo Kasi banned six small Chinese mining companies operating in the province for failing to register their businesses, a move subsequently endorsed by the Chinese Ministry of foreign affairs. In March 2022, the United States Department of the Treasury sanctioned African Gold Refinery Ltd., a large gold refinery based in Uganda owned by Belgian businessman Alain Goetz, blaming the company for accepting hundreds of millions of dollars worth of gold from the DRC without questioning its origin. In December 2022, Goetz was also sanctioned by the European Union.

Lithium

The DRC has globally significant lithium reserves. As of 2022, there are no active lithium mines in the DRC, but several projects are in development. Lithium deposits include Manono-Kitolo mine, which formerly produced tin and coltan until it was closed in 1982.

Tantalum, Tin, and Tungsten

The so called 3T minerals, standing for tantalum, tin, and tungsten, are mostly mined in relatively small scale artisanal mines in the eastern DRC.

Coltan is mined in the DRC, mostly in the eastern part of the country in places like the Rubaya mines. Coltan consists of mixtures of the minerals columbite and tantalite in varying proportions, which can be refined into niobium and tantalum, respectively. Cassiterite is a mineral containing tin. It is mined in mines such as Bisie. Tungsten is also mined in the DRC.

The 3T minerals have been described as conflict minerals, due to their connections to funding violence such as the ongoing Kivu conflict. Several initiatives exist to source conflict-free extraction, with mixed reception as to their effectiveness.

Others
Industrial mining of other minerals has also occurred in the DRC. In contrast to copper-cobalt, which is central to the DRC economy, these other resources are more peripheral, and many of the mines are not necessarily active.

Peak production occurred in 1955 at 429,000 tons, which by 1974 had slowly declined to 103,000 tons. After discovering the deposit in 1911 and having its opening delayed by the first world war, Géomines operated an underground coal mine west of Kalemie along the Lukuga River from 1923 until 1931.

There are significant manganese deposits from Kisenge-Kamata-Kapolo, in Lualaba Province, totaling about 12 Mt of ore. Manganese is also found at Kasekelesa and Mwene-Ditu. Mining at the Kisenge was begun in 1951 by the Forrest Group. In March 2018, 1000 tons of manganese ore from the mine made up the first train of the reopened Benguela Railway following decades of closure due to the Angolan civil war. The shipment was from the DRC parastatal Entreprise Minière de Kisenge Manganèse (EMKM).

The DRC has some uranium deposits, most notably the Shinkolobwe deposit, which has among the highest Uranium grades in the world. Historically, uranium from the Shinkolobwe mine was used in several nuclear weapons programs, including serving as the majority of the raw material for the United States' Manhattan Project. Officially, the mine is closed, but illicit artisanal uranium mining has continued, though who is buying the uranium is not publicly known.

Beginning as a large open pit copper mine in 1924, the Kipushi Mine eventually became an underground producer of zinc, germanium, and silver. Closed since 1993, the owners of the mine plan to restart production in the 2020s.

History

Pre-colonial mining
Mining was in the DRC was carried out for centuries before colonial powers arrived. For example, the Katanga Cross, made from sand cast copper, existed from at least the 14th century, and evolved in use first as a symbol of wealth, and later a form of currency. At the time of the Berlin conference that precipitated the Scramble for Africa, the copper mining region of the DRC was controlled by the Yeke Kingdom headed by Msiri. The kingdom had an already well-established trade network in resources, with copper from the Katanga region making up an important part.

Congo Free State and Belgian Congo (1885-1960)

Several mining companies were established under Belgian rule, such as Union Minière du Haut-Katanga in 1906, Forminière in 1913, and Société minière du Bécéka in 1919. Mines active in this period included the Kipushi Mine. For example, the Belgian colonial administrator Georges Moulaert was active in setting up several mining companies, but was publicly criticized for heavy use of forced labour in his gold mining operations.

DRC and Zaire (1960-1997)
During the Congo crisis, Belgian companies were significant supporters of the failed attempts by the State of Katanga and South Kasai to establish their own states independent of the DRC. Following the end of the crisis, most of the mining assets of Belgian-owned companies were nationalized as Congolese state-owned companies, usually known as parastatal companies.

Mass scale looting, 1998
During the Second Congo War mass-scale looting of mineral assets by all combatant forces—Congolese, Rwandan, Ugandan and foreign civilians—took place. The small artisanal mining operations the fighters were robbing sometimes shut down afterwards and larger foreign businesses reduced operations as well.

After Rwanda, Uganda, and Burundi's successful 1998 invasion of eastern and southeastern DRC in the Second Congo War (1998-2003), "mass scale looting" took root, according to the United Nations. While initial invasion tactics were still being worked out, military commanders were already making business deals with foreign companies for the Congo's vast mineral reserves. Between September 1998 and August 1999 stockpiles of minerals, agricultural products, timber, and livestock were illegally confiscated from Congolese businesses, piled onto trucks, and sold as exports from the confiscating countries.
Rwandan and Ugandan troops forced local businesses to shut their doors by robbing and harassing civilian owners. Cars were stolen to such an extent that Uganda showed a 25% increase in automobile ownership in 1999. DARA-Forest Company illegally logged then sold Congolese timber on the international market as its own export.
An American Mineral Fields executive allowed rebels to use his private Learjet in return for a $1 billion mining deal. Global Witness in 2004 described the mining corporations' rush to acquire coltan-rich land in the rebel territory of the DRC as a continuation of the pattern of exploitation in play since the 1885 Conference of Berlin.

Mining resumes, 2001- present
Following the peace accord in 2003, the focus returned to mining. Rebel groups supplied international corporations through unregulated mining by soldiers, locals organized by military commanders and by foreign nationals. The political framework was unstable.

The mass looting died down as stocks of minerals were depleted, and soldiers were encouraged by their commanders to take part in small-scale looting, which started an "active extraction phase". Natural resources that were not stolen were often purchased with counterfeit Congolese francs, which contributed to inflation. Air transportation companies that once operated in the Congo disappeared and were replaced by companies affiliated with foreign armies. The Congolese government lost tax revenue from natural resources entering or leaving its air fields; air services were controlled by Rwandan and Ugandan troops, who routinely exported coltan from the Congo. The increase in air transportation networks also increased exploitation because of the new transport routes. Coltan is the most profitable mineral export from the Congo, but it is particularly difficult to track because it is often listed as cassiterite, for which export taxes are lower. Coltan had been illegally extracted and sold via Burundi since 1995, three years before the invasion began. The International Monetary Fund (IMF) stated that Burundi has no "gold, diamonds, columbotantalite, copper, cobalt or basic metals" mining operations, but has nonetheless been exporting them since 1998.
Likewise, Rwanda and Uganda had no known production sites for many of the minerals they exported at vastly increased rates after they invaded the DRC. "Free zone areas" make diamonds difficult to track because they can be repackaged and "legally" sold as diamonds from that country. The DRC exported few minerals after the invasion because its rural infrastructure was destroyed; mining and agricultural outputs waned. yet the air transportation networks' new transport routes increased exploitation by the invaders.

In 2000, Rwanda spent $70 million supporting about 25,000 troops and Uganda spent $110 million supporting twice as many troops. Rwanda and Uganda financed their war efforts through commercial deals, profit-sharing with companies, and taxation, among other things. Rwandan soldiers stole coltan collected by villagers and sold it to diamond dealers. From the coltan trade alone, the Rwandan army may have collected $20 million per month, and coltan profits have been used to pay back loans from foreign creditors.

Rebel groups MLC, RCD-Goma, and RCD-ML each made their own deals with foreign businessmen for cash and/or military equipment. Battlefields most commonly centered on areas that held a lot of diamond and coltan potential and foreign armies' occupation of the eastern region was maintained by illegal resource exploitation. For $1 million per month rebel group RCD-Goma gave a coltan monopoly to SOMIGL which they in turn poured into efforts to gain control from RCD-ML of mineral-loaded land. To get fast cash to gain control of government land, the DRC gave a diamond monopoly to Dan Gertler's International Diamond Industries (IDI), which was supposed to pay the Congolese government $20 million for it. But it paid only $3 million, yet continued to extract diamonds from the region and sell them internationally. Upon request of the IMF and World Bank the DRC liberalized diamond trade, after which IDI threatened to sue for breach of contract, a contract they themselves did not honor.

Corporations and Western countries purchasing coltan from Rwanda, Uganda, or Burundi were aware of its origin; aid from western donors was funneled directly into Rwandan and Ugandan war efforts. The German government gave a loan to a German citizen to build his coltan export business in the DRC, for which he enlisted the help of RCD-Goma soldiers. Mineral plunder in the DRC was easy once the central authority had collapsed because of the extremely weak financial system, as well as the international corporations and governments that imported illegal minerals disregarding illegal conflicts on the part of proper standards.

The US documented that many minerals were purchased from the DRC even though the DRC had no record of exporting them. A lack of state stability combined with international corporations' and foreign governments’ interest in investing in Congolese minerals increased the pace at which the DRC was shaken from its fragile foundation. The UN identified the perpetrators of illegal resource exploitation in the DRC, but was unable to help prevent the economic exploitation of the country.

IMF loan for debt relief, 2009-2012

In 2009 the DRC signed a loan contract with the International Monetary Fund (IMF) for $12 billion of debt relief in 2010. The loan included trade conditions, such as liberalization of the diamond trade. The same year, the IFC began working with the DRC on legal and regulatory improvements through an advisory service called "Conflict Affected States in Africa" (CASA). It suspended most activities during a dispute between IFC and the DRC over the expropriation of a mining investment.

In September 2010, the Forces démocratiques de libération du Rwanda (FDLR), a group of mostly Hutu rebels, were reported to exploit timber, gold and coltan in North Kivu and South Kivu.
In September 2010, the government banned mining in the east of the country, to crack down on illegal organisations and corruption.
In 2011, the DRC was accused of "selling off billions of dollars of mining assets at knockdown prices". In 2012 the DRC began reviewing its 2002 mining code. It received warnings from the World Bank, was heavily lobbied by mining companies and investors who wanted to be included in the revision discussions, and did not complete the project.

In 2012 the DRC failed to provide sufficient details on the process whereby state mining company Gécamines ceded mining assets to a company based in the British Virgin Islands, and the IMF called off a $530 million loan. At the end of 2012 the IMF suspended the last loan payments, because of a lack of transparency in the DRC's process for awarding mining contracts. The mining sector has since expanded, but commodity prices have declined and this has hampered the DRC's progress.

In July 2013, the IFC advisory service CASA re-engaged and helped the DRC adopt and implement the Organization for the Harmonization of Business Law in Africa (OHADA) Treaty.
Despite Congolese military operations to take Kinshasa mines from the Mai-Mai militia and the FDLR, the guerillas still controlled some of the mines and created disturbances. In 2014 Kabila told mining companies in Katanga province to postpone plans that would require more power due to an "energy crisis".  In March 2016, 42 NGOs urged Kabila to update the 2002 mining code after a draft was submitted to parliament in March, but Kabila decided to wait until metal markets recovered.

Foreign involvement 
In 2011, at least twenty-five international mining companies were active in the D.R. Congo according to Datamonitor 360. Canadian-domiciled mining companies had the highest presence, with nine in total: African Metals Corporation, Banro Corporation, DiamondCore, El Niño Ventures, First Quantum Minerals, ICS Copper Systems, Lundin Mining, and Anvil Mining, misidentified as Australian, and Katanga Mining, misidentified as British.

Seven firms were incorporated in Australia: Austral Africa Resoiurces, BHP, AVZ Minerals, Green Machine Development Corporation, Lindian Resources, Mawson West, and Tiger Resources. Three were incorporated in South Africa: (African Rainbow Minerals, and AngloGold Ashanti, two in the United Kingdom: (Asa Resources Group and Randgold Resources), two from the United States: (Century Aluminum, Copper & Gold), and one each from China (CIC Mining Resources, with Japanese Eco Energy Group's African subsidiary, Eco Project Company), Morocco (Managem), and Switzerland (Xstrata).

In 2008 and 2009, the Congolese operations of larger international companies, AngloGold Ashanti, BHP Billiton, and Xstrata were all in the exploration and development phase, while Canada had four companies, Anvil Mining, First Quantum Minerals, Katanga Mining, and Lundin Mining involved in large-scale commercial extraction for several years or more.

Canada 

In 2004 the Congolese military killed between seventy and one hundred civilians in the town of Kilwa, near Anvil Mining's Dikulushi mine, which resulted in legal proceedings against Anvil Mining in the DRC and Canada, investigations by the Australian Federal Police and by the World Bank Group's Office of the Compliance Advisor/Ombudsman.

In 2005, the World Bank's Multilateral Investment Guarantee Agency (MIGA) funded the first DRC project by Canada and Ireland as co-investors, on behalf of the Dikulushi Mine held by Anvil Mining in Katanga Province.

According to the Congolese government, in 2009 Canadian companies held US$4.5 billion in mining-related investments in the DR Congo.

In 2009, First Quantum, active in the D.R.C since 1997, had reported its corporate social responsibility contributions amounted to 3% of the Congolese gross national income. It was the DRC's largest taxpayer that year, accounting for between one-eighth and one-quarter of collected revenue. Since 2009, First Quantum Minerals and Heritage Oil, have had their mining permits revoked by the DRC government. First Quantum closed all its Congolese operations in 2010, and in concert with other stakeholders initiated international arbitration proceedings against the Congolese government. The Congolese revocation was seen as a rebuke for the Government of Canada's alleged attempts to obstruct  the negotiation of International Monetary Fund and World Bank debt relief to the DRC in 2010.
 In 2012, First Quantum's legal dispute with the DRC ended in an out-of-court settlement.

At the end of the 2000s, the DRC ranked either first or second-largest among African countries for Canadian mining.  The Government of Canada reported 28 Canadian mining and exploration companies operating in the D.R. Congo between 2001 and 2009, with four carrying out commercial-scale extraction; collectively, these companies' assets in the DRC ranged between Cdn.$161 million in 2003 and $5.2 billion in 2008.

Canada's mining ministry, Natural Resources Canada, estimated the 2009 value of Canadian-owned mining assets in the D.R. Congo at Cdn.$3.3 billion, ten times more than in 2001, making the DRC the African country with second-highest African level of Canadian investment after Madagascar, and Canadian investment in the Congo representing a sixth of total Canadian mining assets in Africa. In 2011, Natural Resources Canada valued Canadian mining assets in the DRC at Cdn.$2.6 billion . The majority of Canadian-based mining companies currently or previously active in the DR Congo have been involved in either exploration and development or large-scale mining of the Congo's copper and cobalt resources.  Based on World Bank estimates, three Canadian companies First Quantum Minerals, Lundin Mining in partnership with the US firm Freeport McMoRan Copper & Gold and Katanga Mining were predicted in 2010 to create more than two-thirds of total Congolese copper output from 2008 to 2013, and for more than two-thirds of total Congolese cobalt output from 2008 to 2014. These companies, and Canadian-incorporated Anvil Mining, were involved in industrial copper and cobalt extraction during 2000-2010.

As of early 2011, another eight junior Canadian mining companies including Ivanhoe Nickel & Platinum and Rubicon Minerals Corporation, reported holdings of copper and cobalt concessions in Katanga province. Nine Canadian junior mining companies, including Kinross Gold, previously held copper and/or cobalt concessions, but have since abandoned them, or sold them to other Canadian or South African firms.

In the diamond sector, Montreal-based Dan Gertler has been active since 1997. Seven other Canadian junior companies reported owning properties in the DRC during 2001-2009, including Canaf Group through its 2008 acquisition of diamond mining company New Stone Mining, and BRC DiamondCore.

Montreal-based Shamika Resources has been exploring for tantalum, niobium, tin and tungsten in the Eastern DRC and Loncor Resources for gold, platinum, tantalum and other metals. Two Canadian-registered companies own petroleum concessions in the DRC: Heritage Oil, whose founder and former CEO is Tony Buckingham, and EnerGulf Resources.

Up until early 2011, four of the nine International Finance Corporation sponsored or proposed D.R.C projects were for Canadian-owned companies active in the DRC: to Kolwezi/Kingamyambo Musonoi Tailings SARL owned by Adastra Minerals ($50.0m., invested in 2006), Africo Resources Ltd. (acquisition of Cdn.$8m. in Africo shares, invested in 2007), and Kingamyambo Musonoi Tailings SARL as acquired by First Quantum, proposed in 2009 at a value of US$4.5 million in equity funding.

In 2011, Canada's Fraser Institute annual survey of mining executives reported the DRC's ranking of its mining exploration investment favourability fell from eighth-poorest in 2006 down to second-poorest in 2010, among 45 African, Asian and Latin American countries and 24 jurisdictions in Canada, Australia and the United States, and this was attributed to "the uncertainty created by the nationalization and revision of contracts by the Kabila government".

In 2012, Banro Corporation began gold production at its Twangiza Mine, after owning gold concessions in the South Kivu and Maniema provinces, the Twangiza-Namoya gold belt, since 1996. Six other Canadian companies have previously owned Congolese gold properties, including Barrick Gold (1996–1998), and Moto Goldmines (2005–2009).

China

China and the DRC signed an MOU on the Belt and Road Initiative (BRI) cooperation during a tour of China’s Foreign Minister, Wang Yi, making the DRC, China’s 45th Belt and Road Initiative partner in Africa.

Also known as the “New Silk Road,” the initiative consists of a network of railways, pipelines, highways and ports linking these networks of infrastructure to other Belt and Road Initiative partner countries in Russia, Europe, India, Central Asia and Southeast Asia.
A positive move for the DRC and China relations when China decided to write off debts from the DRC and the new partnering for the Belt and Road Initiative, this will encourage further cooperation between the two countries and encourage investment from more Chinese miners, like China Molybdenum, to enter investments into the Congolese copper and cobalt industry.

Impacts of natural resource extraction on the DRC

Environmental impacts

Resource extraction has many impacts on the cultural and environmental diversity of the DRC; it is difficult to quantify the environmental degradation of the country, which is unstable and difficult for researchers to enter. It is also always difficult to quantify loss of biodiversity as animals are mobile and the lack of roads and navigable rivers hamper transportation into wilderness areas for researchers.

Mining can be an intensive process and has affected some wilderness areas, including national parks and wildlife reserves such as Kahuzi-Biega and the Okapi Wildlife Reserve, both of which are World Heritage Sites. Mining in these areas is typically artisanal; a small-scale mining method that takes place in river beds and can, cumulatively, be very environmentally damaging. Artisanal mining degrades riparian zones, creating erosion and heavy silting of the water. The tailings are often dumped into the rivers and can be contaminated with mercury and cyanide, degrading the health of the river systems and putting people and wildlife at risk.

Miners and refugees are relocating to parks in search of minerals; a reported 10,000 people have moved into Kahuzi-Biega and 4,000 to the Okapi Wildlife Reserve. This increases the pressures on wildlife as timber is cut down and used for cooking fuel, and wildlife is killed for bushmeat. Also, as people enter into these areas animals such as primates are collected for trade on the black market. Others are poached for their hides, or for their tusks, like elephants.
	
The extent of logging has been difficult to quantify. Much of the logging that occurs is primarily for target hardwood species, rather than clear-cutting which can be assessed by satellite imaging. Observations have shown an increased number of logging trucks moving across borders. Logging destroys valuable animal habitat and increases access into forested areas making it easier for poachers, miners to go there.

Socio-cultural repercussions

Many factors contribute to the Democratic Republic of the Congo's severe socio-economic hardships, and not all resource extraction operations have had an entirely negative impact on Congolese society at large.

That said, the negative consequences of some forms of resource extraction, such as coltan mining, are devastating. For example, as worldwide demand for consumer electronics has increased, so has the demand for tantalum, or coltan (DCA 2006) and reportedly, "much of the finance sustaining the civil wars in Africa, especially in the Democratic Republic of the Congo, is directly connected to coltan profits" (DCA 2006, pp 1). A United Nations report has echoed this assessment.

In the DRC, there are wars both between Congolese and conflicts with neighboring nations. Although these wars have components of intertribal conflict, in several cases the conflicts have been induced by external forces, such as changes in international support and foreign aid, and demand for resource extraction. As a result of tantalum mining and wars, societies in the eastern regions of the Congo are experiencing heightened physical and economic insecurity, health problems and human-rights violations. In the Ituri region, a violent conflict is occurring between the Lendu and the Hema tribes. Analysts have determined that the conflict has intertribal as well as economic components brought about by the patterns of coltan extraction.

Tantalite (coltan) mining can cause health problems for women and children who work in the mines. As more women turn to mining for income, they are performing dangerous tasks such as pounding the stone which contains tantalum. The fibers this releases get into the lungs and affect both women and babies they carry on their backs. "More worrying, the majority of babies, often on the backs of their mothers during the horrendous task of pounding coltan, have started showing similar signs of disease and pain to those of their mothers".

Child labour is common in the DRC, and the mining industry is no exception. Children in the region are also forced and coerced to become soldiers.

The labor shift from farming to mining has been linked to food shortages and insecurity. Yet the DRC has some of the richest soils and favorable climatic conditions for food production on the African continent. Before the reign of Mobutu Sese Seko, the DRC was one of the major exporters of food to the rest of Africa. "The richly fertile soil (especially that in the eastern highlands which is volcanic in origin) could produce enough food to feed half of Africa, but the country is so poor that at present its people do not produce enough food to feed themselves". As reported by the BBC in 2017, according to Global Witness, more than 20% of the DRC's mining revenue is being lost "due to corruption and mismanagement"; more than $750 million has gone missing since 2014.

Environmental and occupational health

Civilian populations have suffered significant health impacts from mining and the associated conflicts. A 2009 study in Katanga Province found "substantial exposure to several metals, especially in children. The urinary Co concentrations found in this population are the highest ever reported for a general population." In 2016, researchers discovered extensive metal contamination in the fish in Katanga's Lake Tshangalele, near mining and other metallurgical operations in Likasi, in species commonly eaten by the local population. A study of coltan miners in North Kivu Province also found very high levels of exposure. Workers at the Ruashi Mine reported headaches and musculoskeletal and respiratory disorders. Environmental contamination in soils has been shown to correlate with proximity to former mining sites: "These values are much higher than the sediment guidelines for the protection of aquatic life and international soil clean-up standards. Enrichment factor and geoaccumulation index results indicated important contribution of mining activities to the study sites pollution in addition to natural background."

The exploitation of natural resources is directly related to the ongoing conflict in the region and subsequent humanitarian crises. These health impacts come from labor, human rights violations, and collapse of social norms. Health and safety standards are largely specified in Congolese law, but government agencies have not enforced them effectively, so there are many grave labor violations. Minimum wage laws are rarely followed at mines. Work week hour standards, overtime payment and rest periods are largely ignored as well. Child labor laws are rarely enforced; child laborers comprise up to 30% of the mining labor force. Deaths and violent injury at mining work sites are commonplace.

Civilians, including large numbers of children, have been regularly forced into labor, especially as miners and soldiers. Many miners become enslaved when they fail to pay back debt to their employer. Rebel and militia groups commit widespread human rights abuses, including rape, enslavement, torture, disappearances and killing of civilians. These groups compete for finances from illegal mining. Reports indicate that corporations have facilitated these abuses by obtaining minerals from areas controlled by these groups. Sexual violence is an especially widespread and devastating issue across the country. Between 1.69 and 1.80 million women reported being raped in their lifetime. Around mines, survival prostitution, sex slavery, and forced child prostitution have been observed. This widespread sexual violence contributes to the spread of HIV/AIDS as well.

During the Second Congo War, three million civilians died, largely due to malnutrition or disease. Nearly as many were internally displaced. Destruction of agricultural land and cattle, and the interest in mining profits, led to a decrease in food access and increase in malnutrition.

As of 2001, assessment and assistance by outside organizations has been difficult, as access to mining areas has been limited by poor road infrastructure, corrupt government officials and hostile militias. Recently, reductions in mortality rate have been documented, linked to improvements in security, humanitarian and politic issues. As of 2002 improvements were limited by continued unregulated mining. Exploitation of natural resources by rebel groups supplying international corporations continues to impair the growth of peace and stability.

See also

References

Further reading

External links
First Blood Diamonds, Now Blood Computers? by Elizabeth Dias, Time Magazine, July 24, 2009
Mining Concessions in the DR Congo, International Peace Information Service.  Interactive, searchable map of all mining concessions in the Democratic Republic of the Congo, based on Cadastre Minier (CaMi) data, July 27, 2010.

 Mining security in Africa